Cochlespira elongata is a species of sea snail, a marine gastropod mollusk in the family Cochlespiridae.

Description
The size of an adult shell varies between 25 mm and 37 mm.

Distribution
This species occurs in the Atlantic Ocean off Southern and Eastern Brazil.

References

 Simone, L.R.L. (1999) The anatomy of Cochlespira Conrad (Gastropoda, Conoidea, Turridae) with a description of a new species from the southeastern coast of Brazil. Revista Brasileira de Zoologia, 16, 103–115

External links
 

elongata
Gastropods described in 1999